The Lieutenant of Inishmore  is a black comedy by Martin McDonagh, in which the 'mad' leader of an Irish National Liberation Army splinter group discovers that his cat has been killed. It has been produced twice in the West End and on Broadway, where it received a Tony Award nomination for Best Play. In 2014, The Lieutenant of Inishmore was ranked in The Daily Telegraph as one of the 15 greatest plays ever written.

Plot

In Ireland in 1993, the Northern Ireland peace process is taking its faltering first steps. Irish National Liberation Army (INLA) man Mad Padraic is pulling out the toenails of Belfast drug dealer James, when he hears that his beloved cat, Wee Thomas, is poorly. He heads back home to the island of Inishmore, where he learns that Wee Thomas is not sick but has been killed. Padraic, a man considered too mad for the Irish Republican Army and sorely trying the patience of his INLA comrades, is intent on revenge. He kills four people and two other cats before Wee Thomas is found alive and well; the first cat was mistaken for him.

Characters
Padraic: (Age: 20 – 25. Lead)
Davey: (Age: 17. Lead)
Donny: (Age: 45 – 50. Lead)
Mairead: (Age: 16. Lead)
Christy: (Age: 30 – 50. Supporting)
Brendan: (Age: 18 – 25. Supporting)
Joey/James: (Age: 18 – 25. Supporting)

Production history
Original RSC/West End production

The Lieutenant of Inishmore was first produced by the Royal Shakespeare Company in Stratford-upon-Avon in 2001. The production was directed by Wilson Milam. In 2002, the production transferred to the Barbican, and then to the Garrick Theatre, before touring the UK.

Original off-Broadway/Broadway production

A new production opened off-Broadway at the Atlantic Theater Company on 27 February 2006. The production received Lucille Lortel Awards, including Outstanding Play and Outstanding Lead Actor
(David Wilmot, tie) with an Obie Award for Martin McDonagh. The play transferred to the Lyceum Theatre, on Broadway where it ran from 3 May to 3 September 2006. The opening night cast included Jeff Binder, Andrew Connolly, Dashiell Eaves, Peter Gerety, Domhnall Gleeson, Brian d'Arcy James, Alison Pill, and David Wilmot. It was directed by Wilson Milam, who directed the original RSC/West End production.<ref>Jones, Kenneth. "McDonagh's Bloody Comedy, Lieutenant of Inishmore, Opens on Broadway" Playbill, 3 May 2006</ref>

Subsequent North American productionsThe Lieutenant of Inishmore has also been produced:

 Pittsburgh Irish and Classical Theatre, in Pittsburgh, Pennsylvania, from 12 July to 4 August 2007.
 GableStage, in Coral Gables, Florida, from 11 August to 9 September 2007
 Fusion Theatre Company in Albuquerque, New Mexico, from 25 October to 18 November 2007
 the Alley Theatre, in the Houston Theater District, from 25 January to 24 February 2008
 Curious Theatre Company in Denver, Colorado from 8 March to 19 April 2008
 San Jose State University's Hal Todd Theatre, from 25 April to 3 May 2008
 The Repertory Theatre of St. Louis from 17 September to 13 October 2008, where it was nominated for five Kevin Kline Awards, of which it took home one.
 The New Repertory Theatre in Boston, Massachusetts, from 26 October to 6 November 2008
 Jobsite Theater in Tampa, Florida in April 2009
 Berkeley Repertory Theatre in Berkeley, California from 17 April to 24 May 2009 under the direction of Les Waters
 Northlight Theatre in Skokie, Illinois, from 29 April 2009 to 7 June 2009, directed by B.J. Jones. This production featured special effects and props designed by Steve Tolin, for which he won the 2009 Jeff Award for Outstanding Achievement in Special Effects.
 Center Theatre Group in Los Angeles from 11 July – 8 August 2010. The cast included Chris Pine as Padraic.
A Contemporary Theater, in Seattle, in October 2010. 
the San Jose Stage Company, San Jose, California, from 26 September to 21 October 2018.

South AmericaThe Lieutenant of Inishmore was first produced in Lima, Peru at Teatro La Plaza ISIL, running from 24 April to 1 July 2008.

Australia

An Australian production ran from 30 September to 18 October 2008, at the Sue Benner Theatre, Metro Arts in Brisbane, Queensland. The New Theatre at Newtown in Sydney, New South Wales presented the play from 24 April 2018 to 26 May 2018.

Ukraine

Adapted ukrainian version (under the name "Kytsyunya") ran in 2019 in Kyiv, presented by "Wild Theatre".

West End revival 2018The Lieutenant of Inishmore'' was revived from June - September 2018 at the Noel Coward Theatre. The production is directed by Michael Grandage and stars Aidan Turner as Padraic.

Awards and nominations
 2006 Alfréd Radok Award for Best Play
 2006 Lucille Lortel Award for Outstanding Play (win)
 2006 Lucille Lortel Award for Outstanding Lead Actor - David Wilmot (win)
 2006 Obie Award for Playwriting - Martin McDonagh (win)
 2006 Tony Award Best Actor in a Play (Wilmot) (nomination)
 2006 Tony Award Best Direction of a Play (nomination)
 2006 Tony Award Best Featured Actor in a Play (Gleeson) (nomination)
 2006 Tony Award Best Featured Actress in a Play (Allison Pill) (nomination)
 2006 Tony Award Play (nomination)
 2009 Jeff Award for Outstanding Achievements in Special Effects - Steve Tolin
 2009 San Francisco Bay Area Critics Circle Award for Best Supporting Actor - Adam Farabee
 2009 San Francisco Bay Area Critics Circle Award for Fight Director - Dave Maier
 2009 San Francisco Bay Area Critics Circle Award for Best Ensemble
 2010 Los Angeles Drama Critics Circle Award for Lead Performance - Chris Pine

2018 West End revival

References

Further reading

External links
 
 
 
 Review of British production
 Site for the Signature Theatre production
 "Buckets of Blood Means It's Curtains" Washington Post
 "'The Lieutenant of Inishmore': Blood and Glee in Rural Ireland" New York Times Broadway Review

2001 plays
Broadway plays
Comedy plays
Plays by Martin McDonagh
Plays set in Ireland
Plays set in the 1990s
Laurence Olivier Award-winning plays
West End plays